is a former Japanese football player and manager.

Playing career
Yokoyama was born in Saitama on July 6, 1969. After graduating from Chuo University, he joined Hitachi (later Kashiwa Reysol) in 1992. He played many matches as offensive midfielder and right side back from first season. In 1998, he moved to Avispa Fukuoka. In 1999, he moved to newly was promoted to J2 League club, Omiya Ardija based in his local. He retired end of 2000 season.

Coaching career
After retirement, Yokoyama started coaching career at Omiya Ardija in 2001. He mainly coached for youth team until 2011. In 2012, he moved to Japan Football League club Blaublitz Akita and became a manager. He managed the club 1 season and the club finished at 13th place. In 2013, he moved to Shonan Bellmare and became a coach. In 2016, he moved to J3 League club Tochigi SC. The club won the 2nd place for 2 years in a row (2016-2017) and was promoted to J2 League from 2018. In 2018 season in J2, Tochigi SC finished at the 17th place of 22 clubs and he resigned end of 2018 season. In 2019, he signed with J3 club AC Nagano Parceiro.

Club statistics

Managerial statistics
Update; December 31, 2019

References

External links
 
 
 
 Profile at Baublitz Akita

1969 births
Living people
Chuo University alumni
Association football people from Saitama Prefecture
Japanese footballers
J1 League players
J2 League players
Japan Football League (1992–1998) players
Kashiwa Reysol players
Avispa Fukuoka players
Omiya Ardija players
Japanese football managers
J2 League managers
J3 League managers
Blaublitz Akita managers
Tochigi SC managers
AC Nagano Parceiro managers
FC Gifu managers
Association football midfielders